Sir John Lowther, 1st Baronet (1 April 1759 – 19 March 1844) of Swillington, Yorkshire was an English landowner and Member of Parliament.

He was the second son of Sir William Lowther, 1st Baronet and educated at Westminster School and Trinity College, Cambridge.

On 4 September 1790, he married Lady Elizabeth Fane (d. 1844), daughter of John Fane, 9th Earl of Westmorland. They had four children:
Sir John Henry Lowther, 2nd Baronet (1793–1868)
George William Lowther (17 October 1795 – 1805)
Sir Charles Hugh Lowther, 3rd Baronet (1803–1894)
Elizabeth Lowther (d. 2 October 1863), unmarried

He purchased the estate at Wilton Castle in about 1806 and built a new mansion house there. At some time after his elder brother was created Earl of Lonsdale, the Swillington estate was made over to John, who was himself created a baronet on 3 November 1824.

He died in 1844 and was succeeded by his eldest son John Henry Lowther.

References

Lowther pedigree 2

External links 
 

1759 births
1844 deaths
People educated at Westminster School, London
Alumni of Trinity College, Cambridge
Baronets in the Baronetage of the United Kingdom
Members of the Parliament of Great Britain for Carlisle
Members of the Parliament of Great Britain for English constituencies
British MPs 1780–1784
British MPs 1784–1790
British MPs 1796–1800
Members of the Parliament of the United Kingdom for English constituencies
UK MPs 1801–1802
UK MPs 1802–1806
UK MPs 1806–1807
UK MPs 1807–1812
UK MPs 1812–1818
UK MPs 1818–1820
UK MPs 1820–1826
UK MPs 1826–1830
UK MPs 1830–1831
Younger sons of baronets
English landowners
John